John Widowfield is a former Republican member of the Ohio House of Representatives, representing the 42nd District from 2001 to 2008. He was elected twice to the Cuyahoga Falls City Council from 1998 to 2001. He graduated from Hiram College and obtained an MBA from the University of Akron. Widowfield is a former U.S. Army paratrooper who received numerous awards for meritorious service including: The Army Commendation Medal and The Joint Services Achievement Medal. Widowfield is married and the father of 2 children.

Living people
Republican Party members of the Ohio House of Representatives
21st-century American politicians
Year of birth missing (living people)